"The Bassetts' Fancy Dress Ball" is the second episode of the second series of the 1990s British comedy television series Jeeves and Wooster. It is also called "A Plan for Gussie".

In the US, this episode was originally broadcast as the fifth episode of the fourth series of Jeeves and Wooster on 5 February 1995 on Masterpiece Theatre. The second episode of the second series was instead "Bertie Takes Gussie's Place At Deverill Hall".

Background 
Adapted from The Code of the Woosters.

Cast
 Jeeves – Stephen Fry
 Bertie Wooster – Hugh Laurie
 Sir Roderick Spode – John Turner 
 Sir Watkyn Bassett – John Woodnutt
 Madeline Bassett – Diana Blackburn
 Stiffy Byng – Charlotte Attenborough
 Gussie Fink-Nottle – Richard Garnett
 Constable Oates – Campbell Morrison
 Rev. Stinker Pinker – Simon Treves
 Barmy Fotheringay-Phipps – Martin Clunes
 Oofy Prosser – Richard Dixon

Plot
Gussie Fink-Nottle has been keeping a notebook containing insulting observations on Sir Watkyn Bassett and Sir Roderick Spode, in order to keep his courage up about them.  Gussie is naturally terrified of Spode, and even the smallest misunderstanding will put his life in jeopardy.  Spode has two jobs—he is the leader of the Black Shorts, but also designs and sells women's underwear, being the proprietor of a lingerie shop called Eulalie Soeurs. He is perpetually in fear that his followers in his first role will discover his second one and it is the threat of this disclosure which is used by Bertie to stop him assaulting Gussie. Jeeves revealed the secret pseudonym "Eulalie". When Gussie loses the notebook, he calls on Bertie to help find it. Gussie (dressed as a devil) is assaulted by Spode (a Roman soldier). Bertie finds a way of keeping Spode from beating Gussie into a jelly telling Spode: "Spode, I know all about Eulalie."

The Rev. Harold "Stinker" Pinker and Stephanie "Stiffy" Byng wish to marry, but Stiffy's guardian Sir Watkyn doesn't approve. Stiffy blackmails Bertie into helping her convince her guardian otherwise.

Meanwhile Bertie comes into possession of a policeman's helmet.

See also
 List of Jeeves and Wooster characters

References

External links

Jeeves and Wooster episodes
1991 British television episodes